Moses Patrick Paukan, Sr. (September 29, 1933 – April 16, 2017) was an American businessman and politician.

Born in Fish Valley, Alaska Territory, Paukan went to school in Akulurak, Alaska and was a Yupik. He settled in Saint Mary's, Alaska and was a businessman and mechanic. Paukan served on the St. Mary's City Council and as mayor. He also served on the school board. From 1967 to 1970, Paukan served in the Alaska House of Representatives and was a Democrat.

References

1933 births
2017 deaths
Alaska city council members
Businesspeople from Alaska
Mayors of places in Alaska
Democratic Party members of the Alaska House of Representatives
Native American state legislators in Alaska
People from Kusilvak Census Area, Alaska
School board members in Alaska
Yupik people
20th-century American businesspeople